Agonoxena phoenicia is a moth of the family Agonoxenidae. It is found in Australia (Queensland).

The wingspan is about 10 mm. Adults are yellow, with a rust-coloured line along each forewing.

The larvae feed on Archontophoenix alexandrae. They live under the leaves of their host plant in thin silken web.

References

Agonoxeninae
Moths described in 1966
Moths of Australia